Lasse Münstermann (born 6 April 1979) is a German retired snooker player and pundit. He began playing at the age of 11, and in 1994 he played in his first World Amateur Championship in Johannesburg, South Africa. For a year he trained in England at the Rushden Snooker Academy, where prominent snooker players like Peter Ebdon, James Wattana and Ding Junhui studied.

Career
Münstermann is the winner of several German Championships (Team: 1995 and 2005; double: 1994 and 1997; Single: 2003, 2004 and 2006; U21: 2000). His success in the European tour gave him a place on the main tour and 2001 World Snooker Championship in the 2000–01 season, but it was short-lived. At the 2005 World Games he reached the quarter-finals. For Germany, he was part of a team with Sascha Lippe and Itaro Santos which won the European Team Snooker Championship in Ghent, Belgium, in early 2007. He qualified for the Players Tour Championship 2010/2011, which was held in Germany. He has also contributed to PAT (Playing Ability Test) Snooker along with Thomas Hein, Thomas Moser and Frank Schröder.

Tournament wins

Amateur

References

1979 births
Living people
German snooker players
Snooker writers and broadcasters
Competitors at the 2005 World Games
Sportspeople from Lower Saxony